Notable people with the surname Phoenix include:

 Arlyn Phoenix (born 1944), American activist
 Charles Phoenix (born 1962), American historian/humorist
 Nick Phoenix (Born 1967), British composer
 Joaquin Phoenix (born 1974), American actor, producer and musician
 Naomi Phoenix English singer-songwriter
 Pat Phoenix (1923–1986), British actress
 Rain Phoenix (born 1972), American actress
 River Phoenix (1970–1993), American actor, musician and activist.
 Summer Phoenix (born 1978), American actress
 Thomas Phoenix American lawyer dan politician (1835–1838) 
 Tanit Phoenix (born 1980), South African super model and actress
 Joshua Phoenix (born 1988) Collector of fine items 

English-language surnames